Going Straight is a 1916 American silent crime drama film directed by C.M. Franklin and S.A. Franklin. The film stars Norma Talmadge and is one of the few films featuring her that still exists.

Cast
 Norma Talmadge – Grace Remington
 Ralph Lewis – John Remington
 Ninon Fovieri – The Remington's Child, son
 Francis Carpenter – The Remington's Child, son
 Fern Collier – The Remington's Child, daughter
 Ruth Handforth – Maid
 Eugene Pallette – Dan Briggs
 Georgie Stone – Jimmy (Dan's urchin sidekick)
 Kate Toncray – Mrs. Van Dyke
 'Baby' Carmen De Rue – Mrs. Van Dyke's Child
 Violet Radcliffe – Mrs. Van Dyke's Child

References

External links

1916 films
1916 crime drama films
American crime drama films
American silent feature films
American black-and-white films
Films directed by Chester Franklin
Films directed by Sidney Franklin
Surviving American silent films
1910s American films
Silent American drama films